Inlow was the name of a post office in Lane County, Oregon, United States, on what is now Nelson Mountain Road near the confluence of Chickahominy and Nelson creeks, approximately one mile north of Walton. Inlow post office was established June 20, 1899, and was named for either Igo Inlow or his father, "Doc" Inlow. The office closed to Hale in 1901.

References 

Unincorporated communities in Lane County, Oregon
1899 establishments in Oregon
Populated places established in 1899
Unincorporated communities in Oregon